Mayors National Climate Action Agenda, or Climate Mayors, is an association of United States mayors with the stated goal of reducing greenhouse gas emissions. Founded by Los Angeles mayor Eric Garcetti, former Houston mayor Annise Parker, and former Philadelphia mayor Michael Nutter, the group represents 435 cities and nearly 20% of the U.S. population.

Founded in 2014, the organization received one million dollars in start-up funding from the Clinton Global Initiative to support the founding mayors' efforts to organize cities in advance of the signing of the 2015 Paris Agreement.

The organization has stated its commitment to upholding the emissions goals of the Paris Agreement on climate change even if the United States withdraws from the agreement.

Partner cities

 Alameda, California
 Albany, California
 Albany, New York
 Albany, Oregon
 Albuquerque, New Mexico
 Alexandria, Virginia
 Allentown, Pennsylvania
 Ambler, Pennsylvania
 Amesville, Ohio
 Anchorage, Alaska
 Anderson, South Carolina
 Ann Arbor, Michigan
 Apalachicola, Florida
 Arcata, California
 Ardsley, New York
 Arvin, California
 Asheville, North Carolina
 Aspen, Colorado
 Athens, Ohio
 Atlanta, Georgia
 Austin, Texas
 Baltimore, Maryland
 Bayfield, Wisconsin
 Beaverton, Oregon
 Bellevue, Idaho
 Bellingham, Washington
 Belmont, California
 Berkeley, California
 Bethlehem, Pennsylvania
 Beverly, Massachusetts
 Beverly Hills, California
 Bexley, Ohio
 Binghamton, New York
 Birmingham, Alabama
 Bisbee, Arizona
 Blacksburg, Virginia
 Bloomington, Illinois
 Bloomington, Indiana
 Bloomington, Minnesota
 Boise, Idaho
 Boston, Massachusetts
 Boulder, Colorado
 Bozeman, Montana
 Breckenridge, Colorado
 Bridgeport, Connecticut
 Brighton, New York
 Brisbane, California
 Buchanan, Michigan
 Buffalo, New York
 Burlingame, California
 Burlington, Vermont
 Burnsville, Minnesota
 Cambridge, Massachusetts
 Camuy, Puerto Rico
 Cape Canaveral, Florida
 Cape May Point, New Jersey
 Carmel, Indiana
 Carrboro, North Carolina
 Carson, California
 Carver, Minnesota
 Champaign, Illinois
 Chapel Hill, North Carolina
 Charles Town, West Virginia
 Charleston, South Carolina
 Charlotte, North Carolina
 Charlottesville, Virginia
 Chattanooga, Tennessee
 Cherry Hill, New Jersey
 Chicago, Illinois
 Chula Vista, California
 Cincinnati, Ohio
 Claremont, California
 Clarkston, Georgia
 Cleveland, Ohio
 Coconut Creek, Florida
 College Park, Maryland
 Columbia, Missouri
 Columbia, South Carolina
 Columbus, Ohio
 Concord, New Hampshire
 Conshohocken, Pennsylvania
 Cooperstown, New York
 Coral Gables, Florida
 Corte Madera, California
 Cortland, New York
 Corvallis, Oregon
 Cotati, California
 Crete, Nebraska
 Culver City, California
 Cupertino, California
 Cutler Bay, Florida
 Dallas, Texas
 Daly City, California
 Davis, California
 DeKalb, Illinois
 Delray Beach, Florida
 Denver, Colorado
 Des Moines, Iowa
 Detroit, Michigan
 Dover, New Hampshire
 Downingtown, Pennsylvania
 Dublin, California
 Dubuque, Iowa
 Duluth, Minnesota
 Dunn, Wisconsin
 Duquesne, Pennsylvania
 Durham, North Carolina
 East Brunswick, New Jersey
 East Lansing, Michigan
 Eden Prairie, Minnesota
 Edgewater, Colorado
 Edina, Minnesota
 Edmonds, Washington
 El Cerrito, California
 El Monte, California
 Elburn, Illinois
 Elgin, Illinois
 Emeryville, California
 Encinitas, California
 Erie, Pennsylvania
 Eugene, Oregon
 Evanston, Illinois
 Everett, Washington
 Fairbanks North Star Borough, Alaska
 Fairfax, Virginia
 Fairfield, Iowa
 Falcon Heights, Minnesota
 Falls Church, Virginia
 Fanwood, New Jersey
 Fayetteville, Arkansas
 Ferndale, Michigan
 Flagstaff, Arizona
 Flint, Michigan
 Fort Bragg, California
 Fort Collins, Colorado
 Fort Lauderdale, Florida
 Fort Wayne, Indiana
 Franklin, North Carolina
 Fremont, California
 Fresno, California
 Frisco, Colorado
 Gainesville, Florida
 Gambier, Ohio
 Gary, Indiana
 Gladstone, Oregon
 Glen Rock, New Jersey
 Glendale, California
 Glendale, Wisconsin
 Gloucester, Massachusetts
 Golden, Colorado
 Goleta, California
 Grand Rapids, Michigan
 Greenbelt, Maryland
 Greensboro, North Carolina
 Greenville, South Carolina
 Gulfport, Florida
 Half Moon Bay, California
 Hallandale Beach, Florida
 Hamtramck, Michigan
 Hartford, Connecticut
 Hastings-on-Hudson, New York
 Hawaii County, Hawaii
 Hayward, California
 Healdsburg, California
 Highland Park, New Jersey
 Highland Park, Illinois
 Highlands, North Carolina
 Hillsborough, North Carolina
 Hoboken, New Jersey
 Hollywood, Florida
 Holyoke, Massachusetts
 Honolulu, Hawa'ii
 Hood River, Oregon
 Houston, Texas
 Hudson, New York
 Huron, California
 Hyattsville, Maryland
 Imperial Beach, California
 Iowa City, Iowa
 Irvington, New York
 Ithaca, New York
 Jackson, Michigan
 Jackson, Wyoming
 Jersey City, New Jersey
 Kalamazoo, Michigan
 Kansas City, Missouri
 Kauai County, Hawaii
 Kenosha, Wisconsin
 Ketchum, Idaho
 Kingston, New York
 Kirkland, Washington
 Kissimmee, Florida
 Knoxville, Tennessee
 La Crosse, Wisconsin
 Lafayette, Colorado
 Laguna Woods, California
 Lake George, New York
 Lakewood, Colorado
 Lakewood, Ohio
 Lancaster, Pennsylvania
 Lansing, Michigan
 Lapeer, Michigan
 Las Cruces, New Mexico
 Lauderhill, Florida
 Laurel, Maryland
 Lawrence, Kansas
 Lewes, Delaware
 Little Rock, Arkansas
 Long Beach, California
 Long Branch, New Jersey
 Longmont, Colorado
 Los Altos, California
 Los Altos Hills, California
 Los Angeles, California
 Los Gatos, California
 Louisville, Kentucky
 Lynnwood, Washington
 Macon, Georgia
 Madison, Wisconsin
 Malden, Massachusetts
 Malibu, California
 Manchester, New Hampshire
 Manhattan Beach, California
 Manitou Springs, Colorado
 Maplewood, Minnesota
 Maplewood, Missouri
 Marbletown, New York
 Marlboro, New Jersey
 Martinez, California
 Maui County, Hawaii
 Medford, Massachusetts
 Melrose, Massachusetts
 Memphis, Tennessee
 Menlo Park, California
 Miami, Florida
 Miami Beach, Florida
 Middleton, Wisconsin
 Middletown, Connecticut
 Milford, Connecticut
 Milford, Pennsylvania
 Millbrae, California
 Millcreek, Utah
 Milwaukee, Wisconsin
 Milwaukie, Oregon
 Minneapolis, Minnesota
 Miramar, Florida
 Missoula, Montana
 Moab, Utah
 Monona, Wisconsin
 Montgomery, Illinois
 Montpelier, Vermont
 Mooresville, North Carolina
 Morgantown, West Virginia
 Morristown, New Jersey
 Morro Bay, California
 Mosier, Oregon
 Mount Pocono, Pennsylvania
 Mountain View, California
 Mukilteo, Washington
 Napa, California
 Nashua, New Hampshire
 Nashville, Tennessee
 Nederland, Colorado
 New Bedford, Massachusetts
 New Haven, Connecticut
 New Orleans, Louisiana
 New Paltz, New York
 New York, New York
 Newark, New Jersey
 Newburyport, Massachusetts
 Newport News, Virginia
 Newton, Massachusetts
 Niagara Falls, New York
 Normal, Illinois
 Norman, Oklahoma
 North Bay Village, Florida
 North Brunswick, New Jersey
 North Miami, Florida
 Northampton, Massachusetts
 Nyack, New York
 Oakland, California
 Ojai, California
 Olympia, Washington
 Orlando, Florida
 Ossining, New York
 Palo Alto, California
 Park City, Utah
 Pawtucket, Rhode Island
 Pembroke Pines, Florida
 Petaluma, California
 Philadelphia, Pennsylvania
 Phoenix, Arizona
 Pinecrest, Florida
 Pittsboro, North Carolina
 Pittsburg, Kansas
 Pittsburgh, Pennsylvania
 Pittsfield, Massachusetts
 Plainsboro, New Jersey
 Pleasant Ridge, Michigan
 Pompano Beach, Florida
 Port Townsend, Washington
 Portland, Maine
 Portland, Oregon
 Portsmouth, New Hampshire
 Princeton, New Jersey
 Providence, Rhode Island
 Raleigh, North Carolina
 Rancho Cordova, California
 Redmond, Washington
 Redwood City, California
 Rehoboth Beach, Delaware
 Reno, Nevada
 Richmond, California
 Richmond, Virginia
 Rochester, Minnesota
 Rochester, New York
 Rockaway Beach, Oregon
 Rockford, Illinois
 Rockwood, Michigan
 Rohnert Park, California
 Royal Oak, Michigan
 Sacramento, California
 Saint Helena, California
 Saint Paul, Minnesota
 Salem, Massachusetts
 Salem, Oregon
 Salisbury, Maryland
 Salt Lake City, Utah
 San Antonio, Texas
 San Carlos, California
 San Diego, California
 San Fernando, California
 San Francisco, California
 San Jose, California
 San Leandro, California
 San Luis Obispo, California
 San Marcos, Texas
 San Mateo, California
 Santa Ana, California
 Santa Barbara, California
 Santa Clara, California
 Santa Cruz, California
 Santa Fe, New Mexico
 Santa Monica, California
 Santa Rosa, California
 Sarasota, Florida
 Saratoga Springs, New York
 Satellite Beach, Florida
 Savanna, Illinois
 Seattle, Washington
 Secaucus, New Jersey
 Skokie, Illinois
 Sleepy Hollow, New York
 Smithville, Texas
 Snoqualmie, Washington
 Somerset, Maryland
 Somerville, Massachusetts
 Somersworth, New Hampshire
 Sonoma, California
 South Bend, Indiana
 South Miami, Florida
 South Orange Village, New Jersey
 South Portland, Maine
 Springfield, Massachusetts
 St. Louis Park, Minnesota
 St. Louis, Missouri
 St. Peters, Missouri
 St. Petersburg, Florida
 Stamford, Connecticut
 State College, Pennsylvania
 Stockton, California
 Sunnyvale, California
 Sunrise, Florida
 Surfside, Florida
 Swarthmore, Pennsylvania
 Swedesboro, New Jersey
 Syracuse, New York
 Tacoma, Washington
 Takoma Park, Maryland
 Tallahassee, Florida
 Tampa, Florida
 Tarrytown, New York
 Telluride, Colorado
 Tempe, Arizona
 Toledo, Ohio
 Torrance, California
 Traverse City, Michigan
 Trenton, New Jersey
 Tualatin, Oregon
 Tucson, Arizona
 Tukwila, Washington
 Union City, New Jersey
 University City, Missouri
 Urbana, Illinois
 Vail, Colorado
 Vancouver, Washington
 Venice, Florida
 Ventura, California
 Verona, New Jersey
 Washington, D.C.
 Watsonville, California
 Waukegan, Illinois
 West Hartford, Connecticut
 West Haven, Connecticut
 West Hollywood, California
 West Lafayette, Indiana
 West Linn, Oregon
 West New York, New Jersey
 West Palm Beach, Florida
 West Sacramento, California
 West Wendover, Nevada
 Westland, Michigan
 Westminster, Colorado
 Weston, Florida
 Wheat Ridge, Colorado
 White Plains, New York
 Whitefish, Montana
 Whitney Point, New York
 Windsor, California
 Windsor Heights, Iowa
 Winston-Salem, North Carolina
 Woodland, California
 Woodside, California
 Woodstock, Illinois
 Worcester, Massachusetts
 Yonkers, New York
 Ypsilanti, Michigan

See also
 United States withdrawal from the Paris Agreement
 United States Climate Alliance, a group of states committing to Paris Agreement goals
 Under2 MOU

References

2014 establishments in the United States
Climate change in the United States
Eric Garcetti